An actuary is a business professional who deals with a financial situation of risk and uncertainty. This is a list of notable actuaries and others who have influenced the profession.

Born in the 17th century
 John Graunt (1620–1674), English, constructed one of the first life tables
 William Petty (1623–1687), English, much early writing on life tables
 Johan de Witt (1625–1672), Dutch, early pioneering work on life annuities
 Edmond Halley (1656–1742), English, constructed one of the first life tables

Born in the 18th century
 James Dodson (1705–1751), English, developed statistical mortality tables
 Alexander Webster (1708–1784), Scottish, developed a scheme for providing pensions to widows of church ministers
 Richard Price (1723–1791), Welsh, introduced correct methods for values of contingent reversions
 Edward Rowe Mores (1731–1778), English, founder of The Society for Equitable Assurances on Lives and Survivorships and the first person to use the professional title "actuary"
 William Morgan (1750–1833), Welsh
 George Barrett (1752–1821), English
 Nathaniel Bowditch (1773–1838), probably the second American insurance actuary; Essex Fire and Marine
 Joshua Milne (1776–1851), English
 Benjamin Gompertz (1779–1865), English, developed the Gompertz-Makeham law of mortality and the Gompertz function
 John Finlaison (1783–1860), Scottish, first president of the Institute of Actuaries
 Griffith Davies (1788–1855), Welsh
 Thomas Galloway (1796–1851), Scottish

Born in the 19th century
 Elizur Wright (1804–1885), American, campaigned for valuation laws requiring life insurance companies to hold reserves to guarantee payment of benefits
 Wesley S. B. Woolhouse (1809–1893), English, co-founder of the Institute of Actuaries
 James Joseph Sylvester (1814–1897), English
 Ole Jacob Broch (1818–1889), Norwegian, founded Christiania almindelige gjensidige Forsørgelsesanstalt, Scandinavia's first life insurance company
 Ernst Engel (1821–1896), German, founded the first mortgage insurance company at Dresden
 Thomas Bond Sprague (1830–1920), British
 Esprit Jouffret (1837–1904), French
 Thorvald N. Thiele (1838–1910), Danish
 Emory McClintock (1840–1916), American
 Anders Lindstedt (1854–1939), Swedish
 Thomas Bassett Macaulay (1860–1942), Canadian
 Thomas Jaffrey (1861–1953), Scottish
 Miles Menander Dawson (1863–1942), American
 Gabriel Gabrielsen Holtsmark (1867–1954), Norwegian
 George James Lidstone (1870–1952), British
 Joseph Burn (1871–1950), English
 Johan Frederik Steffensen (1873–1961), Danish
 Alexander Jobson (1875–1933), Australian
 Maurice Princet (1875–1973), French
 Henry Louis Rietz (1875–1943), American
 I. M. Rubinow (1875–1936), Russian
 Alfred M. Best (1876–1958), American, founder of the A. M. Best company
 Filip Lundberg (1876–1965), Swedish, founder of mathematical risk theory and managing director of several insurance companies
 William Palin Elderton (1877–1962), English
 Alfred J. Lotka (1880–1949), American
 Sverre Krogh (1883–1957), Norwegian
 Harald Cramér (1893–1985), Swedish, developed numerous statistical theories and methods
 Ivo Lah (1896–1979), Slovene
 Dorothy Spiers (1897–1977), first woman to qualify as an actuary in the United Kingdom
 Henrik Palmstrøm (1900–1998), Norwegian

Born in the 20th century
Oswald Jacoby (1902–1984), American, youngest person to pass four examinations of the Society of Actuaries
 Pedro Teotónio Pereira (1902–1972), Portuguese
 Wendell Milliman (1905–1976), American, co-founder of Milliman & Robertson
 Andreas Tømmerbakke (1905–1994), Norwegian
 Bruno de Finetti (1906–1985), Italian
 Frank Redington (1906–1984), English, developed a theory concerning the immunisation of fixed-income portfolios
 Bernard Benjamin (1910–2002), English
 Cecil J. Nesbitt (1912–2001), Canadian
 Stuart A. Robertson (1918–2005), American, co-founder of Milliman & Robertson
 James C. Hickman (1927–2006), American
 Hugh Hedley Scurfield (1935–2020), English
 Phelim Boyle (1941–), Northern Irish
 Jeremy Gold, (1942–2018), American
 Paul McCrossan (1942–), Canadian
 Ed Savitz (1942–1993), American
 Ward Whitt (1942–), American
 Howard Winklevoss (1943–), American
 Robert Astley (1944–), Canadian
 Bryn Davies (1944–), British
 Christopher Daykin (1948–), English
 Steven Haberman (1951–), English
 James Robert Crosby (1956–), English
 Terri Vaughan (1956—), American
 Tan Suee Chieh (1959–), Singaporean
 David X. Li (~1960s), Chinese, advanced the use of Gaussian copula models to price collateralized debt obligations
 Michael Shackleford (1965–), English
 Roelof Botha (1973–), South African

References

 
Lists of people by occupation
Lists of mathematicians by field
Statistics-related lists